Syria competed at the 2018 Asian Games in Jakarta and Palembang, Indonesia, from 18 August to 2 September 2018.

Medalists

The following Syrian competitors won medals at the Games.

|  style="text-align:left; width:78%; vertical-align:top;"|

|  style="text-align:left; width:22%; vertical-align:top;"|

Competitors 
The following is a list of the number of competitors representing Syria that will participate at the Games:

 Athlete who also competed in Kurash.

Athletics 

Field events

Basketball 

Summary

5x5 basketball
Syria men's team entered the competition and drawn in the group B. The team definitely qualified to the next round after United Arab Emirates left the group.

Men's tournament

Roster
The following is the Syria roster in the men's basketball tournament of the 2018 Asian Games.

Group B

Quarter-final

5th–8th classification

Fifth place game

3x3 basketball
Syria also set a men's and women's team that competed in the 3-on-3 basketball. The men's team placed in the pool C while the women's team in the pool D based on the FIBA 3x3 federation ranking.

Men's tournament

Roster
The following is the Syria roster in the men's 3x3 basketball tournament of the 2018 Asian Games.
Mhd Ammar Al Ghamian
Omar Idelbi
Khalil Khouri
Ahmad Khyyata

Pool C

Women's tournament

Roster
The following is the Syria roster in the women's 3x3 basketball tournament of the 2018 Asian Games.
Farah Assad
Noura Bshara
Johna Mbayed
Cedra Sulaiman

Pool D

Boxing 

Men

Cycling

Road

Track

Pursuit

Qualification legend: FA=Gold medal final; FB=Bronze medal final

Omnium

Equestrian 

Jumping

Football 

Syria drawn in the group C at the men's football event.

Summary

Men's tournament 

Roster

Group C

Round of 16

Quarter-final

Gymnastics

Artistic Gymnastics
Men's

Ju-jitsu 

Men

Judo 

Men

Kurash 

Men

Women

Sambo

Swimming

Men

Triathlon 

Individual

Weightlifting

Men's

Wrestling

Men's freestyle

Men's Greco-Roman

References

Nations at the 2018 Asian Games
2018
Asian Games